Damián Pablo Nieto  (born 24 April 1985 in Buenos Aires) is an Argentine footballer who plays for Santiago Morning in the Chilean Primera División, as a central back.

References

External links
Damián Nieto at Football Lineups

1985 births
Footballers from Buenos Aires
Living people
Argentine footballers
Argentine expatriate footballers
S.L. Benfica B players
Club Atlético Huracán footballers
Club Almagro players
Santiago Morning footballers
Expatriate footballers in Chile
Expatriate footballers in Portugal
Argentine Primera División players
Chilean Primera División players
Argentine expatriate sportspeople in Portugal
Association football central defenders